The Second Federal Electoral District of Chiapas (II Distrito Electoral Federal de Chiapas) is one of the 300 Electoral Districts into which Mexico is divided for the purpose of elections to the federal Chamber of Deputies and one of 12 such districts in the state of Chiapas.

It elects one deputy to the lower house of Congress for each three-year legislative period, by means of the first past the post system.

District territory
The Second District of Chiapas is located in the Altos de Chiapas region and covers the municipalities of Aldama, Bochil, Chalchihuitán, Chapultenango, Chenalhó, Francisco León, Huitiupán, Ixhuatán, Jitotol, Larráinzar, Ocotepec, Pantelhó, Pantepec, Pueblo Nuevo Solistahuacán, Rayón, San Andrés Duraznal, San Juan Cancuc, Santiago el Pinar, Simojovel, Sitalá, Tapalapa and Tapilula.

The district's head town (cabecera distrital), where results from individual polling stations are gathered together and collated, is the city of Bochil.

Previous districting schemes

1996–2005 district
Between 1996 and 2005, the Second District was broadly located in the same region of Chiapas, but with a different composition. It covered municipalities from both the Los Altos region and the extreme north of the state:
Amatán, Chapultenango, El Bosque, Francisco León, Huitiupán, Ixhuatán, Ixtacomitán, Ixtapangajoya, Jitotol, Juárez, Ostuacán, Pantepec, Pichucalco, Pueblo Nuevo Solistahuacán, Rayón, Reforma, Simojovel, Solosuchiapa, Sunuapa, Tapilula and Tapalapa. It was at that time centred on the city of  Pichucalco.

Deputies returned to Congress from this district

L Legislature
 1976–1979: Fernando Correa Suárez (PRI)
LI Legislature
 1979–1982: Pedro Pablo Zepeda Bermúdez (PRI)
LII Legislature
 1982–1985: Areli Madrid Tovilla (PRI)
LIII Legislature
 1985–1988:
LIV Legislature
 1988–1991: Javier López Moreno (PRI)
LV Legislature
 1991–1994:
LVI Legislature
 1994–1997: Antonio Pérez Hernández (PRI)
LVII Legislature
 1997–2000: Francisco Javier Martínez Zorrilla (PRI)
LVIII Legislature
 2000–2003: Andrés Carballo Bustamante (PRI)
LIX Legislature
 2003–2006: María Elena Orantes López (PRI)
LX Legislature
 2006–2009: Víctor Ortiz del Carpio (PRI)

References 

Federal electoral districts of Mexico
Government of Chiapas